The 2001 Euro Beach Soccer League, was the fourth edition of the Euro Beach Soccer League (EBSL), the premier beach soccer competition contested between European men's national teams, known as the European Pro Beach Soccer League at the time, occurring annually since its establishment in 1998. The league was organised by Beach Soccer Worldwide (BSWW) between June 1 and September 2, 2001 in seven different nations across Europe.

This season, whilst the teams remained part of one overall cohort, they were split into two groups. Meanwhile, the concept of a regular season and post-season system was introduced. Each team competed in their respective group to try and earn a place in the season-finale and title-deciding event, the Superfinal.

Spain entered the competition as two-time defending champions and successfully defended their title, to win their third European crown.

The league also doubled as the qualification process for the 2002 Beach Soccer World Championship. The nations finishing in first, second and third place qualified.

Format changes
In 2001, BSWW introduced major changes to the EBSL. No longer would the stages of fixtures be played as small knockout tournaments; this was changed to having the stages played in a round robin format, with the results tallied up in a table to determine the winners of the stage. The bonus points awarded in previous years for being stage winners and runners-up was also scrapped. Teams now earned points for the league table solely on match wins.

2001 also saw the introduction of the famous Superfinal play-off event, seen in every edition since. The league champions were no longer to be determined after all the stages were complete based on the league table. The league would now be split into a regular season and post-season system. It was decided from this edition forward, the teams with the most points at end of the regular season stages of fixtures are to qualify for the newly founded post-season playoff event to be known as the Superfinal in which the title is then to be contested directly. The winner of the Superfinal then becomes league champions.

Teams
This season 8 nations took part in the Euro Beach Soccer League whom were and were distributed as follows.

Group A

Group B

Superfinal berths
For the inaugural Superfinal, there were four berths available to the top four teams with the most points in the league at the end of the regular season, after all the stages of fixtures were complete. This successful quartet advanced to the season-finale playoff event to contest for the league title. The table summarises in what positions nations needed to finish in their respective groups in order to qualify to the Superfinal.

Allocations:

The groups were seen as being on an equal footing in terms of the distribution of the quality of the teams between the two and so both were allocated two of the four berths to reflect this. The winners and runner-up of both groups qualified for the Superfinal.

Group A
Group A consisted of three rounds of fixtures known as stages, hosted in three of the four countries participating; France, Spain and England. The remaining Group A nation, Switzerland, did not host a stage. All four teams took part in each. In each stage, the teams played each other once. The nation who earned the most points at the end of the stage was crowned stage winners.

At the end of the three stages all results were tallied up in a final league table.

Stage 1
The first stage took place in Hyde Park, London, England. Spain commenced their EBSL campaign with a stage crown.

Matches

Final standings

Stage 2
The second stage took place in Marsielle, France. The Spanish won a second consecutive stage.

Matches

Final standings

Stage 3
The third stage took place in Málaga, Spain. Spain's victory in the final round meant a clean sweep of all three stage titles for the hosts.

Matches

Final standings

Final table
The top two teams qualified to the Superfinal. The remaining nations in third and fourth place exited this season's EBSL.

Spain were crowned decisive winners of the group, finishing the three stages without loss. They earned a place in the Superfinal alongside runners-up France. England and Switzerland were left far adrift of the Superfinal qualification spots.

Group B
Group B also consisted of three rounds of fixtures known as stages, hosted in three of the four countries participating; Portugal, the Republic of Ireland and Italy. The remaining Group B nation, Germany, did not host a stage. All four teams took part in each. In each stage, the teams played each other once. The nation who earned the most points at the end of the stage was crowned stage winners.

At the end of the three stages all results were tallied up in a final league table.

Stage 1
The first stage took place in Dublin, Ireland. Portugal won the first stage of Group B.

Matches

Final standings

Stage 2
The second stage took place in Carcavelos, Portugal. The Portuguese won a second consecutive stage.

Matches

Final standings

Stage 3
The third stage took place in Riccione, Italy. Portugal won the third and final stage crown ensuring they were the victors of all three.

Matches

Final standings

Final table
The top two teams from qualified to the Superfinal. The remaining nations in third and fourth place exited this season's EBSL.

Portugal dominated the group and were crowned winners, finishing without dropping a single point. They earned a place in the Superfinal alongside runners-up Italy. Germany and the Republic of Ireland finished well off the pace of the Superfinal qualifiers.

Superfinal

Qualified teams
This is a summary of the teams who qualified for the Superfinal.

Results
Dates: 1–2 September 2001
Location: Monte Carlo, Monaco
This season the inaugural Superfinal was played as a straight knockout tournament. All four teams contesting the title started in the semi-finals. The teams played one match per round until the final when the winner of the 2001 Euro Beach Soccer League was crowned. The losers of the semi-finals played in a third place play-off match to decide third and fourth place in the final league placements.

The format of the semi-finals saw the winners of Group A play the runners-up of Group B and the winners of Group B play the runners-up of Group A.

Semi-finals

Third place play-off

Championship final

Winners

Final standings
Spain beat Portugal in the final to extend their run of two successive Euro Beach Soccer League titles, to three, at just their fourth attempt.

Finishing in the top three positions also earned those nations qualification straight into the upcoming World Cup.

Notes

Sources

 Roonba
 BSWW archive
 RSSSF

Euro Beach Soccer League
2001 in beach soccer